West Township is a township in Montgomery County, Iowa, USA.

History
West Township was created in 1854.

References

Townships in Montgomery County, Iowa
Townships in Iowa